The Melody of Murder, (Original Title: Mordets Melodi), is a 1944 Danish film noir directed by Bodil Ipsen and starring Gull-Maj Norin and Poul Reichhardt.

Plot 
The dark tale revolves around a sexually ambiguous serial killer, whose crimes are committed to a French cabaret song. The police suspect a chanteuse who sings the same tune during her performances.

Cast 
Gull-Maj Norin  ... Cabaret Singer Odette Margot / Sonja
Poul Reichhardt ... Emcee Max Stenberg
Angelo Bruun ... 	Hypnotist Louis Valdini
Peter Nielsen ... 	Detective Baunsø
Else Petersen ... 	Mrs. Baunsø
Karen Poulsen ... 	Wardrobe Lady Flora Kristiansen
Ib Schønberg ... 	Theater Director Perm
Petrine Sonne ... 	Landlady Sonja Bohman
Charles Wilken ... Pensionist
Anna Henriques-Nielsen ... Salesgirl Sonja Neie
Lili Heglund ... 	Baker Lise Rasmussen
Valsø Holm ... 	
Per Buckhøj ... 	
Helga Frier ... 	Cleaning Lady Nielsen
Lis Løwert ... 	Maid Poula

Reception 
Produced during the German occupation of Denmark in World War II, the film was praised by critics for its "stylish cinematography, thematic intensity, and dark vision of Copenhagen;" and consider it one of the most influential Danish films of that period.

References

External links 
IMDb
Det Danske Fiminstitut 

1944 films
1944 crime films
1940s serial killer films
Danish crime films
1940s Danish-language films
Films directed by Bodil Ipsen
Danish black-and-white films
Film noir